Karchambu-e Shomali Rural District is a rural district (dehestan) in the Karchambu District of Buin va Miandasht County, Isfahan Province, Iran. At the 2006 census, its population was 3,293, in 734 families.  The rural district has 10 villages.

Villages
Hendukosh

References 

Rural Districts of Isfahan Province
Buin va Miandasht County